In the United States, a public health emergency declaration releases resources meant to handle an actual or potential public health crisis. Recent examples include:

 Incidents of flooding
 Severe weather
 the 2009 swine flu pandemic, which Homeland Security Secretary Janet Napolitano described as a "declaration of emergency preparedness."
 the COVID-19 pandemic
the 2022 monkeypox outbreak

The National Disaster Medical System Federal Partners Memorandum of Agreement defines a public health emergency as "an emergency need for health care [medical] services to respond to a disaster, significant outbreak of an infectious disease, bioterrorist attack or other significant or catastrophic event." In order to activate the National Disaster Medical System (NDMS), "a public health emergency may include but is not limited to, public health emergencies declared by the  Secretary of HHS [Health and Human Services] under 42 U.S.C. 247d, or a declaration of a major disaster or emergency under the Robert T. Stafford Disaster Relief and Emergency Assistance Act (Stafford Act), 42 U.S.C. 5121-5206)."

The declaration of public health emergency in the March 2009 flood of the Red River in North Dakota was made under section 319 of the Public Health Service Act.  Under section 1135 of the Social Security Act, this declaration permits the state government to request waivers of certain Medicare, Medicaid, and CHIP requirements from the Centers for Medicare and Medicaid Services (CMS) Regional Office.  Examples include allowing Medicare health plan beneficiaries to go out of network, allowing critical access hospitals to take more than the statutorily mandated limit of 25 patients, and not counting the expected longer lengths of stay for evacuated patients against the 96-hour average.  

In the swine flu outbreak, the declaration allowed the distribution of a federal stockpile of 12 million doses of Tamiflu to places where states could quickly get their share if they decided they needed it, with priority going to the five states with known cases.  Because Obama's choice for Secretary of HHS, Kathleen Sebelius, had not yet been confirmed, the public announcement of the emergency was made by President Obama and Homeland Security Secretary Napolitano.  However, Charles Johnson, acting HHS secretary, made the formal determination of a public health emergency under section 319 of the Public Health Service Act, 42 U.S.C. § 247d.

The NDMS defines a military health emergency as "an emergency need for hospital services to support the armed forces for casualty care arising from a major military operation, disaster, significant outbreak of an infectious disease, bioterrorist attack, or other significant or catastrophic event."

See also
Public Health Emergency.gov
Public Health Information Network
Public Health Emergency Preparedness
United States Public Health Service#Emergency response since 1999
Surgeon General of the United States
Public health laboratory
United States Public Health Service
United States Public Health Service Commissioned Corps
Disaster Medical Assistance Team
Medical Reserve Corps
Office of the Assistant Secretary for Preparedness and Response
United States Deputy Secretary of Health and Human Services
Public Readiness and Emergency Preparedness Act
Model State Emergency Health Powers Act
Federal Emergency Management Agency
Department of Health and Human Services
Emergency Management Institute

References

Sylves, Richard T. and William L. Waugh, Jr. (1996).  Disaster Management in the U.S. and Canada: The Politics, Policymaking, Administration and Analysis of Emergency Management, 2nd edition.  Springfield, IL: Charles C. Thomas, Publisher, LTD.
Anderson, James (2011).  Public Policymaking, 7th edition.  Boston, MA: Wadsworth, Cengage Learning.

External links
List of Public Health Emergency Declarations issued by the Secretary of the Department of Health and Human Services

United States Public Health Service
Health disasters in the United States